The Wurm is a river in the state of North Rhine-Westphalia in western Germany. It rises in the Eifel mountains and flows for 57 kilometres before discharging into the Rur.

Geography
The Wurm is a left (western) tributary of the Rur. The Rur is a tributary of the Meuse.

The sources of the Wurm are several brooks in the forests southwest of Aachen, which form the Wurm after the Diepenbenden reservoir. From there the Wurm nowadays flows through canals through the city of Aachen, until it resurfaces again at the Europaplatz in the east of Aachen. North of Aachen (between Kerkrade and Herzogenrath) the river forms the border with the Netherlands for approximately 10 km. It flows into the Rur near Heinsberg.

Other towns on the river Wurm are Würselen, Übach-Palenberg and Geilenkirchen.

The name Wurm is thought to originate from the German word warm (same meaning in English), as the source brooks were fed from the thermal springs in Aachen.

Gallery

See also
Rur Basin
List of rivers of North Rhine-Westphalia

References

 

Rivers of North Rhine-Westphalia
Rivers of the Netherlands
Rivers of South Limburg (Netherlands)
Kerkrade
Landgraaf
Rivers of Germany